Dysspastus gracilellus is a moth of the family Autostichidae. It is found on Sicily.

References

Moths described in 1922
Dysspastus
Moths of Europe